Saalfeld station (called Saalfeld (Saale) or Saalfeld (S) by Deutsche Bahn) is the station in the city of Saalfeld in the southeast of the German state of Thuringia. It is classified by Deutsche Bahn as a category 3 station.

History 

The railway reached Saalfeld on 20 December 1871 with the opening of the Gera–Saalfeld line from the northeast. The station was also built at that time. It was from the outset planned as a railway junction and was built on land that was then undeveloped to the east of Saalfeld, opposite the old town, with a large area set aside for operations. In 1874 the Saal Railway was opened from Naumburg via Jena to Saalfeld, giving the city a further rail connection to the northeast. The Franconian Forest Railway was opened via the Rennsteig to Lichtenfels in 1885. This was the second line from Berlin to Munich after the Saxon-Bavarian Railway and was, in fact, a faster route. After it was finished the importance of Saalfeld station grew sharply. It was the last major station before a climb of almost 400 metres through the Franconian Forest.

Other lines were opened to Saalfeld: the Arnstadt–Saalfeld line from Erfurt in 1895, the Schwarza Valley Railway from  Katzhütte and the Köditzberg–Königsee line from Königsee in 1900, the line from Hof 1907 and the Sonneberg–Probstzella railway from Sonnenberg in 1913. During the Second World War, the strategically important station was destroyed in air strikes. The division of Germany reduced its importance, since traffic between East Germany and Bavaria was reduced. However, Interzone trains crossed at Saalfeld, as the Franconian Forest Railway, along with the more easterly line via Hof, were the only rail links between East Germany and Bavaria. The second track was dismantled in 1946 between Saaleck junction near Naumburg and Probstzella as reparations to the Soviet Union.

After German reunification, the importance of the station was restored. In 1994/95 the Saal Railway and Franconian Forest Railway were electrified and the second track were restored. Today it is the only direct ICE route between Berlin and Munich, while the importance of the second line via Hof has declined. In the following years, the station was upgraded to support modern long-distance traffic and received, among other things, three new and fully accessible platforms. The entrance building was renovated and extended.

The completion of the Nuremberg–Erfurt high-speed line will lead to Saalfeld—along with Jena and the Bavarian station of Lichtenfels—losing their ICE stops in favour of Erfurt. There are also plans to restore the six kilometre-long Hell Valley Railway over the former inner German border, which would connect Saalfeld and Hof again.

The marshalling yard to the east of the passenger station is closed.

Operations 
The following services stop at the station (2019):

References

Railway stations in Thuringia
Buildings and structures in Saalfeld-Rudolstadt
Railway stations in Germany opened in 1871